Jazz on a Summer's Day is a concert film set at the 1958 Newport Jazz Festival in Rhode Island, directed by commercial and fashion photographer Bert Stern and Aram Avakian, who also edited the film. The Columbia Records jazz producer, George Avakian, was the musical director of the film.

The film mixes images of water and the city with the performers and audience at the festival. It also features scenes of the 1958 America's Cup yacht races. The film is largely without dialog or narration (except for periodic announcements by emcee Willis Conover).

The film features performances by Jimmy Giuffre; Thelonious Monk; Sonny Stitt; Anita O'Day; Dinah Washington; Gerry Mulligan; Chuck Berry; Chico Hamilton, with Eric Dolphy; and Louis Armstrong, with Jack Teagarden. Also appearing are Buck Clayton, Jo Jones, Armando Peraza, and Eli's Chosen Six, the Yale College student ensemble that included trombonist Roswell Rudd, shown driving around Newport in a convertible jalopy, playing Dixieland.

As was scheduled in advance and announced in the program, the last performer Saturday night was Mahalia Jackson, who sang a one-hour program beginning at midnight, thus ushering in Sunday morning.  The film concluded with her performance of The Lord's Prayer.

In 1999, the film was selected for preservation in the United States National Film Registry by the Library of Congress as being "culturally, historically, or aesthetically significant". The film received a 100% score on Rotten Tomatoes.

Lineup
 Jimmy Giuffre 3: Jimmy Giuffre, Bob Brookmeyer, Jim Hall
 Thelonious Monk Trio: Thelonious Monk, Henry Grimes, Roy Haynes
 Sonny Stitt and Sal Salvador
 Anita O'Day
 George Shearing
 Dinah Washington
 Gerry Mulligan Quartet with Art Farmer
 Big Maybelle
 Chuck Berry
 Chico Hamilton Quintet with Eric Dolphy
 Louis Armstrong and his All-Stars: Trummy Young, Danny Barcelona, and Jack Teagarden
 Mahalia Jackson

Premiere
The film premiered at the 1959 Venice Film Festival.

DVD
The film was also re-released in 2009 by Charly Records and sold with an audio CD of the music and some of the commentary on a 60th anniversary edition.

See also
 List of American films of 1959
 1959 in jazz
 Bert Stern

References

External links
"Jazz on a Summer's Day" by Alan Kurtz (Jazz.com)

 Yanow, Scott. 2004. Jazz on Film: The Complete Story of the Musicians and Music Onscreen. (Backbeat Books) 
Jazz on a Summer’s Day essay by Daniel Eagan in America's Film Legacy: The Authoritative Guide to the Landmark Movies in the National Film Registry, A&C Black, 2010 , pages 562-563 

1959 films
1958 in American music
1958 in American cinema
Documentary films about jazz music and musicians
United States National Film Registry films
Jazz films
Films set in Rhode Island
Newport County, Rhode Island
America's Cup
American documentary films
Concert films
Documentary films about music festivals
Films directed by Aram Avakian
Documentary films about Rhode Island
1950s English-language films
1950s American films